José María Lúcar (born 11 September 1992) is a Peruvian boxer. He competed in the men's heavyweight event at the 2020 Summer Olympics.

References

External links
 

1992 births
Living people
Peruvian male boxers
Olympic boxers of Peru
Boxers at the 2020 Summer Olympics
Pan American Games bronze medalists for Peru
Pan American Games medalists in boxing
Boxers at the 2019 Pan American Games
Medalists at the 2019 Pan American Games
Sportspeople from Lima
21st-century Peruvian people